Lieutenant-General Michael John Hood  is a retired senior Royal Canadian Air Force officer who was Commander of the Royal Canadian Air Force from 2015 until 2018.

Early life and education
In addition to holding a master's degree in International Relations from Auburn University, Hood also holds certifications from Canada's National Security Program and the United States' Air Force Command and Staff College.

Career
Hood joined the Canadian Armed Forces in 1985. He earned his Air Combat Systems Officer Wings in 1988. Most of his flight career was spent on the C-130 Hercules. Hood also served a tour as an Electronic Warfare Officer on the CC-144 Challenger.

After serving as Commanding Officer of both 429 Tactical Airlift Squadron and 436 Tactical Airlift Squadron, he became Plans Officer at Canadian Expeditionary Force Command Headquarters in January 2006. Following this, he became Commander of 8 Wing Trenton in June 2007.

Hood went on to become Director General Air Force Development in 2010, Deputy Director General of International Security Policy in June 2011 and Deputy Commander of the Royal Canadian Air Force in September 2012. After that he became Director of Staff of the Strategic Joint Staff in June 2013 and finally Commander of the Royal Canadian Air Force in July 2015. He retired from the Canadian Armed Forces in May 2018.

Post-retirement
Following his career in the military, in 2018 Hood went on to become an executive in a Vancouver-based energy and mining firm. 

In May 2020, Hood wrote an op-ed in the National Post entitled "Securing Canadian sovereignty in a post-COVID world."

Awards and decorations
As witness the photograph by the Toronto Star, Hood had received as of his appointment to RCAF Commander in July 2015 the following Orders and Decorations:

x30px

25pxx30px

x30px

 He was a qualified RCAF Air Combat Systems Officer and as such wore the Royal Canadian Air Forces Air Combat systems Officer badge.

Notes

References

|-

Living people
Royal Canadian Air Force generals
Commanders of the Order of Military Merit (Canada)
1967 births
Date of birth missing (living people)